The Severan Bridge (also known as Chabinas Bridge or Cendere Bridge or Septimius Severus Bridge) is a late Roman bridge located near the ancient city of Arsameia (today Eskikale),  north east of Adıyaman in southeastern Turkey. It spans the Cendere Çayı (Chabinas Creek), a tributary of Kâhta Creek, on provincial road 02-03 from Kâhta to Sincik in Adıyaman Province. This bridge was described and pictured in 1883 by archeologists Osman Hamdi Bey and Osgan Efendi. It is also has a photo and description in David George Hogarth's Wandering Scholar In The Levant, publ 1896, Chapter 4, a description of an 1894 visit (preface).

Description and history 

The bridge is constructed as a simple, unadorned, single arch on two rocks at the narrowest point of the creek. At  clear span, the structure is quite possibly the second largest extant Roman arch bridge.

The bridge was rebuilt by the Legio XVI Gallica, garrisoned in the ancient city of Samosata (today Samsat) to begin a war with Parthia. Commagenean cities built four Corinthian columns on the bridge, in honor of the Roman Emperor Lucius Septimius Severus (193–211), his second wife Julia Domna, and their sons Caracalla and Publius Septimius Geta as stated on the inscription in Latin on the bridge. Two columns on the Kâhta side are dedicated to Septimius Severus himself and his wife, and two more on the Sincik side are dedicated to Caracalla and Geta, all in 9–10 m in height. Geta's column, however, was removed after his assassination by his brother Caracalla, who damned Geta's memory and ordered his name to be removed from all inscriptions.

The Severan Bridge is situated within one of the most important national parks in Turkey, which contains Nemrut Dağı with the famous remains of Commagene civilization on top, declared as World Cultural Heritage site by UNESCO. In 1997, the bridge was restored. Vehicular traffic was restricted to 5 tons or less.

See also 
 List of Roman bridges
 Roman architecture
 Roman engineering

Notes

Further reading

External links 

 
 Livius.org: Cendere bridge
 Traianus – Technical investigation of Roman public works

Roman bridges in Turkey
Deck arch bridges
Stone bridges in Turkey
Bridges completed in the 3rd century
Commagene
Buildings and structures in Adıyaman Province
Tourist attractions in Adıyaman Province
Arch bridges in Turkey
Pedestrian bridges in Turkey